Shyam Singh is a former member of the Haryana Legislative Assembly from the Bharatiya Janata Party representing the Radaur Vidhan Sabha Constituency in Haryana.

References

Members of the Haryana Legislative Assembly
Bharatiya Janata Party politicians from Haryana
Living people
Place of birth missing (living people)
1948 births